Cavipalpia is a genus of snout moths. It was described by Ragonot, in 1893.

Species
 Cavipalpia argentilavella
 Cavipalpia translucidella Ragonot, 1893

References

Phycitini
Pyralidae genera